Awakened is a 2013 thriller drama film by Joycelyn Engle and Arno Malarone. The film stars Julianne Michelle as Samantha, a woman who returns to her hometown believing that her father murdered her mother years ago. In her exhausting search for the truth about her young mother's untimely death 14 years earlier, Samantha receives help from beyond the grave.

Plot
Samantha Winston (Julianne Michelle), a 22-year-old woman, returns to her home town after 14 years in search of answers to her mother's untimely death. She is convinced that her father, Jack Winston (John Savage), murdered her mother (Kiva Dawson). In a quest for vengeance, Samantha uncovers an evil and devastating truth.

Samantha tried to escape tragedy much of her life. After her young mother's sudden passing, when Samantha was only 8 yrs old, she went to live with her aunt in Minnesota. Within one year her world was shattered again when her aunt was killed in a car crash. Young Samantha was then sent to live with abusive foster families, and finally she ran off to live on her own at age 16.

Returning to her childhood home as a young adult conjures up loving memories of her life as a child. However, harsh reminders of her father's drunken rampages and the sudden death of her 32-year-old mother dominate her thoughts. She is convinced that her father, 20 years her mother's senior, a jealous and verbally abusive alcoholic, committed this unthinkable crime.

In the exhaustive search for evidence Samantha seeks answers from Lucas Drake (Steven Bauer), her mother's best friend and a successful funeral director and mortuary owner, and her Uncle Thomas (Edward Furlong), among others. As the deep dark secrets of evil plots and schemes in this town unfold, the mystery thickens.

Cast
Julianne Michelle as Samantha Winston
Steven Bauer as Lucas Drake
John Savage as Jack Winston
Edward Furlong as Thomas Burton
Stelio Savante as Benny Dawson
Sally Kirkland as Harriet Bendi
Bryan Dechart as Liam Dawson
Sean Stone as Man in Fedora Hat
Joycelyn Engle as Dr. Rockwell
Kiva Dawson as Jennifer Winston
Erin Gerasimovich as Young Samantha
Andrea Kubala as Aunt Patricia

Production

Reception

Accolades

References

External links
 
 

2013 films
2013 horror films
Films shot in New York (state)
2013 thriller drama films
2013 drama films
2010s English-language films